John William Rienstra (born March 22, 1963) is a former guard who played seven professional seasons for the National Football League (NFL)'s Pittsburgh Steelers and the Cleveland Browns. Rienstra attended Temple University after graduating from the Academy of the New Church Secondary Schools.

At the 1986 NFL Draft, the Steelers selected Reinstra with the 9th pick in the first round.

On July 6, 2016, Rienstra discovered the remains of Joe Keller, a man from Cleveland, Tennessee, who had gone missing while on a jog on July 23, 2015, in a remote and rugged area of the Rio Grande National Forest in Conejos County, Colorado.

References

1963 births
Living people
All-American college football players
American football offensive guards
Cleveland Browns players
Players of American football from Grand Rapids, Michigan
Pittsburgh Steelers players
Temple Owls football players
Ed Block Courage Award recipients